The Clinical Trials Directive (Officially Directive 2001/20/EC of 4 April 2001, of the European Parliament and of the Council on the approximation of the laws, regulations and administrative provisions of the Member States relating to implementation of good clinical practice in the conduct of clinical trials on medicinal products for human use) is a European Union directive that aimed at facilitating the internal market in medicinal products within the European Union, while at the same time maintaining an appropriate level of protection for public health. It seeks to simplify and harmonise the administrative provisions governing clinical trials in the European Community, by establishing a clear, transparent procedure.

The Member States of the European Union had to adopt and publish before 1 May 2003 the laws, regulations and administrative provisions necessary to comply with this Directive. The Member States had to apply these provisions at the latest with effect from 1 May 2004.

The Articles of the Directive
The Articles of the Directive:

 Scope (Directive does not apply to non-interventional trials).
 Definitions
 Protection of clinical trial subjects
 Clinical trials on minors
 Clinical trials on incapacitated adults not able to give informed legal consent
 Ethics Committee
 Single opinion
 Detailed guidance
 Commencement of a clinical trial
 Conduct of a clinical trial
 Exchange of information
 Suspension of the trial or infringements
 Manufacture and import of investigational medicinal products
 Labelling
 Verification of compliance of investigational medicinal products with good clinical and manufacturing practice
 Notification of adverse events
 Notification of serious adverse reactions
 Guidance concerning reports
 General provisions
 Adaptation to scientific and technical progress
 Committee procedure
 Application
 Entry into force
 Addressees

The effects of the directive
It is considered to have increased the costs of doing clinical trials in the EU, and to have caused the reduction in the number of such trials, especially of academic-led studies, and ones looking at new uses for old drugs. Germany derogated from the directive. It is due to be replaced by the EU Clinical Trials Regulation in 2016. The changes are due to come into effect in the second half of 2019.

See also
 EudraLex, the collection of rules and regulations governing medicinal products in the European Union
 Directive 65/65/EEC1, requires prior approval for marketing of proprietary medicinal products
 Directive 75/318/EEC, clarifies requirements of 65/65/EEC1 and requires member states to enforce them
 Directive 75/319/EEC, requires marketing authorisation requests to be drawn up only by qualified experts
 Directive 93/41/EEC, establishes the European Agency for the Evaluation of Medicinal Products
 Directive 2001/20/EC, defines rules for the conduct of clinical trials
 Directive 2001/83/EC
 Directive 2005/28/EC, defines Good Clinical Practice for design and conduct of clinical trials
 European Medicines Agency
 Regulation of therapeutic goods
 Investigator's Brochure

References

 EU information on the Clinical Trials Directive

European clinical research
Pharmaceuticals policy
European Union directives
2001 in law
2001 in the European Union